In enzymology, a ceramide cholinephosphotransferase is an enzyme that catalyzes the chemical reaction

CDP-choline + N-acylsphingosine  CMP + sphingomyelin

Thus, the two substrates of this enzyme are CDP-choline and N-acylsphingosine, whereas its two products are CMP and sphingomyelin.

This enzyme belongs to the family of transferases, specifically those transferring non-standard substituted phosphate groups.  The systematic name of this enzyme class is CDP-choline:N-acylsphingosine cholinephosphotransferase. This enzyme is also called phosphorylcholine-ceramide transferase.  This enzyme participates in sphingolipid metabolism.

References 

 
 

EC 2.7.8
Enzymes of unknown structure